Microlinyphia is a genus of dwarf spiders that was first described by U. Gerhardt in 1928.

Species
 it contains eleven species and one subspecies:
Microlinyphia aethiopica (Tullgren, 1910) – East Africa
Microlinyphia cylindriformis Jocqué, 1985 – Comoros
Microlinyphia dana (Chamberlin & Ivie, 1943) – Alaska, California, Oregon, Washington, British Columbia
Microlinyphia delesserti (Caporiacco, 1949) – Tanzania, Uganda, Congo
Microlinyphia impigra (O. Pickard-Cambridge, 1871) – North America, Europe, Caucasus, Russia (Europe to Far East), China
Microlinyphia johnsoni (Blackwall, 1859) – Madeira, Canary Is.
Microlinyphia mandibulata (Emerton, 1882) – USA
Microlinyphia m. punctata (Chamberlin & Ivie, 1943) – USA, Canada
Microlinyphia pusilla (Sundevall, 1830) (type) – North America (Alaska, Colorado, Idaho, Montana, Washington, Wyoming, Alberta, British Columbia, Manitoba, Nunavut, Quebec, Saskatchewan, Yukon Territory), Europe, North Africa, Turkey, Caucasus, Russia (Europe to Far East), Kazakhstan, Central Asia, China, Mongolia, Japan
Microlinyphia simoni van Helsdingen, 1970 – Madagascar
Microlinyphia sterilis (Pavesi, 1883) – Central, East, Southern Africa; China
Microlinyphia zhejiangensis (Chen, 1991) – China

See also
 List of Linyphiidae species (I–P)

References

Araneomorphae genera
Linyphiidae
Spiders of Africa
Spiders of Asia
Spiders of North America